Catasetum callosum, the callused catasetum, is a species of orchid.

callosum
Plants described in 1840